Kenneth Ward (born 16 August 1963) is a Scottish retired footballer who made over 370 appearances as a winger in the Scottish League for Cowdenbeath, Forfar Athletic, St Johnstone, Hamilton Academical, Dunfermline Athletic, Falkirk and Clydebank. He is a member of the Cowdenbeath Hall of Fame.

Career statistics

Honours 
St Johnstone

 Scottish League First Division: 1989–90

Hamilton Academical

 Scottish Challenge Cup: 1992–93

Clydebank

 Scottish League Second Division second-place promotion: 1997–98

Individual

 Cowdenbeath Hall of Fame

References

External links 

1963 births
Living people
Footballers from Fife
Association football wingers
Scottish footballers
Cowdenbeath F.C. players
Forfar Athletic F.C. players
St Johnstone F.C. players
Hamilton Academical F.C. players
Dunfermline Athletic F.C. players
Falkirk F.C. players
Clydebank F.C. (1965) players
Scottish Football League players
People from Blairhall
Oakley United F.C. players
Scottish Junior Football Association players